Josef Kopta (16 June 1894 in Libochovice, Bohemia – 3 April 1962 in Prague) was a Czech writer and journalist.

Before World War I Kopta worked as a bank clerk. In 1914 he was sent to the Eastern front, in 1915 taken prisoner and later joined Czechoslovak Legions in Russia.

After the war he worked as a journalist in newspapers Národní osvobození and Lidové noviny. In 1919 Kopta started to write poetry, without having much of success. During the 1920s and 1930s he, together with František Langer and Rudolf Medek represented literary form concentrated on the Legions (legionářská literatura). Kopta's short novels and stories were the most successful of his writing.

Kopta concentrates on common people dragged into the war and on psychology of characters during the warfare and post-war life. His characters enthusiastically support the national cause and are usually suspicious of the Russian Revolution of 1917. Before and after World War II Kopta published several books for the youth.

Selected works

 Trilogy "The Third Company" (Třetí rota, 1924), "The Third Company on the Magistral" (Třetí rota na magistrále, 1927) and "The Third Company at Home" (Třetí rota doma, 1934) is based on author's experience in the Legions. The first book was the most successful and was filmed in 1931. 
 Novel "Guard No. 47" (Hlídač č.47, 1926), a psychological story about a railway guard who is temporarily deafened and later, after the disability goes away, pretends to still be deaf to find out what his friends and acquaintances are really saying about him. The novel ends tragically. A movie based on the book  was filmed in 1937 , according to a screenplay by Otakar Vávra. A different movie adaptation, directed by Filip Renč, was released in 2008 under the name Guard No. 47. 
 Novel "Adolf waits for the death" (Adolf čeká na smrt, 1933) about common people who, despite lack of fortune, rise to ethical greatness.

References
 Bohuš Balajka et al.: "Přehledné dějiny literatury II", 2001, .
 Vladimír Forst et al.: "Lexikon české literatury: osobnosti, díla, instituce", part 2, vol. 2, K-L, 1993, .

External links
 Short biography (in Czech)
 Complete list of works (in Czech)

1894 births
1962 deaths
People from Libochovice
Czech male writers
Czechoslovak Legions in literature